Chrysolytis is a genus of moths in the family Lyonetiidae.

Species
Chrysolytis deliarcha Meyrick, 1937

External links
Butterflies and Moths of the World Generic Names and their Type-species

Lyonetiidae
Moth genera